Rider–Hopkins Farm and Olmsted Camp is a historic farm and summer camp located at Sardinia in Erie County, New York.  It consists of a  property containing a Greek Revival style brick farmhouse dating to the 1840s known as the James and Abigail Hopkins House. The property retains its original boundaries as purchased from the Holland Land Company in 1828.  The property is also the site of the Olmsted Camp; a turn of the 20th century family summer camp in the Adirondack "Great Camp" tradition.  The camp buildings are in the Arts and Crafts style and grounds are laid out in a naturalistic manner.  The camp was designed by Harold LeRoy Olmsted (1886–1972); a locally prominent architect, landscape architect, and artist, who was also a distant relative of Frederick Law Olmsted.

It was listed on the National Register of Historic Places in 1999.

References

External links
Olmsted Camp website
Rider–Hopkins Farm and Olmsted Camp - Sardinia, New York - U.S. National Register of Historic Places on Waymarking.com
Rider–Hopkins Farm and Olmsted Camp, Buffalo as an Architectural Museum website
The James and Abigail Hopkins House, Buffalo as an Architectural Museum website
Historic Postcards of Sardinia, NY: Hopkins Homestead

Buildings and structures on the National Register of Historic Places in New York (state)
Houses completed in 1840
Houses in Erie County, New York
Greek Revival houses in New York (state)
Colonial Revival architecture in New York (state)
National Register of Historic Places in Erie County, New York
Farms on the National Register of Historic Places in New York (state)